Cooltura is a Polish-language magazine, published weekly in the United Kingdom with a print run of 55.000 copies.

History 
Cooltura was founded by Włodzimierz Wojciech Witkowski, the chairman of Sara-Int LTD and Polish Media Group. The first issue of the magazine has been distributed in 10.000 copies and had 40 pages. It was launched 7 weeks prior to Poland joining the European Union. The third issue of Cooltura increased its page number to 48. The 7th issue, published in May 2004, had 64 pages.

Due to Poland's integration with the EU and the massive influx of Poles into the UK, the magazine has been rapidly developing. In 2007 the content of Cooltura expanded to 132 pages. Between 2007 and 2011 the circulation of Cooltura reached 45.000 copies and has been distributed to 500 outlets in London and the nearby areas.

In March 2009 Cooltura changed its layout and headpiece. The content of the weekly magazine was divided into four main sections: News (based mainly on the information from Polish Press Association (PAP), Features, Entertainment (culture, events listings, crosswords and horoscope) and Classifieds.

February 2010 saw the launch of "Cooltura UK" – the regional edition of the magazine, distributed biweekly to various cities in England and Wales. The circulation of "Cooltura UK" reached 10.000 copies. It was suspended in April 2011.

Initiatives 
Cooltura has been involved in many events related to the life of Poles in London. The magazine regularly organizes music festivals as well as charity events.

Concerts and Festivals 
 Maanam, 21 March 2004 r., O2 Shepherd's Bush Empire
 Bajm, 3 October 2004 r., O2 Shepherd's Bush Empire
 Perfect, 16 March 2007 r., Hammersmith Palais
 Grzegorz Turnau, 12 November 2007 r., Embassy of the Republic of Poland
 Maryla Rodowicz, 30 March 2008 r., Koko
 Budka Suflera, 4 May 2008 r., Koko
 Golec uOrkiestra, 30 November 2008, Koko
 Feel, 7 November 2009, O2 Shepherd's Bush Empire
 Myslovitz, 23 October 2010, O2 Shepherd's Bush Empire
 Cooltura Festival 2009 – Kasia Kowalska, Kasia Cerekwicka, Natalia Lesz, 8 March 2009, O2 Shepherd's Bush Empire
 Cooltura Festival 2010 – Lady Pank and Coma, 24 May 2010, O2 Shepherd's Bush Empire
 Cooltura Festival 2011 – Perfect, 16 May 2011, O2 Shepherd's Bush Empire
 Cooltura Festival 2012 - Tatiana Okupnik and Kora, 24 March 2012, O2 Shepherd's Bush Empire
 Cooltura Festival 2013 - Pectus, Enej and Kombii, 9 March 2013, O2 Shepherd's Bush Empire

Charity events
Polish Children's Donations, London, November 2005 r. – The Charity event where £7, 280, 84 has been raised to buy 30.000 meals for primary school children from some of the poorest boroughs in Poland (Nurc Stacja, Tyrów, Czarna Wieś Kościelna, Szerszenie, Goniądz).

Partner of the events 
 Polish Festival, Slough 2005
 Polish Festival, London, Hanger Lane 2006

Contributors
Agnieszka Bielamowicz, Joanna Biszewska, Tomasz Borejza, Michalina Buenk, Filip Cuprych, Małgorzata Demetriou, Sergiusz Hieronimczak, Stanisław Koczot, Jarosław Malesa, Łukasz Marczewski, Martyna Porzezińska, Andrzej Świdlicki, Marianna Wielgosz, Andrzej Wróbel, Radosław Zapałowski, Dariusz A. Zeller, Marcin Urban, Radosław Zapałowski, Piotr Gulbicki, Joanna Karwecka,

Notes

External links

News magazines published in the United Kingdom
Weekly magazines published in the United Kingdom
Magazines published in London
Magazines established in 2004
Polish-language magazines
Polish-British culture